Benjamin Peterson   may refer to:

Benjamin Peterson, Executive Director of Journalists for Human Rights
Ben Peterson (born 1950), Olympic wrestler